Gregory Rusedski (born 6 September 1973) is a  British and Canadian former tennis player. He was the British No. 1 in 1997, 1999 and 2006, and reached the ATP ranking of world No. 4 for periods from 6 October 1997 to 12 October 1997 and from 25 May 1998 to 21 June 1998.

In 1997, he was the US Open finalist, which led to him receiving the BBC Sports Personality of the Year Award and the ITV Sports Champion of the Year Award. Also, he scored 30 wins and 13 losses with the Great Britain Davis Cup team.

Personal life
Rusedski was born in Montreal, Quebec to a British mother and a father of Polish and Ukrainian descent. He was a very promising junior player in Canada in the 1980s and subsequently caused some anger in Canada when he decided to adopt British citizenship and play for Great Britain in 1995. Rusedski made the decision for "lifestyle reasons", noting that his girlfriend — who would later become his wife — lived in Britain.

Rusedski has been with his wife Lucy Connor since 1991, they met while he was competing in a junior tournament where she was a ball girl. They married in a Roman Catholic ceremony at Douai Abbey in West Berkshire in December 1999. They have two children: a daughter born in 2006 and a son born in 2009.

Career

Rusedski's first career singles tournament title was at the Hall of Fame Championship in Newport, Rhode Island in 1993. He opted to compete for the United Kingdom rather than Canada from 22 May 1995 onwards, a decision which was received poorly by Canadian fans; it was reported that he was given a "traitor's reception" by the crowd when he competed in his first Canadian Open after the switch.

Rusedski reached the singles final of the US Open in 1997, where he lost to Pat Rafter in four sets (shortly thereafter reaching his career high rank of world No. 4). He also won the BBC Sports Personality of the Year Award and the ITV Sports Champion of the Year Award. In 1998, Tim Henman eclipsed Rusedski as the UK number one tennis player. Rusedski, however, won the Grand Slam Cup in 1999.

In the 1999 US Open, Rusedski reached the fourth round where he was eliminated 5–7, 0–6, 7–6 (7–3), 6–4, 6–4, by Todd Martin; Rusedski had a two-sets-to-none advantage and was serving for the match in the third set, then in the fifth set he was up 4–1, but lost 20 of the final 21 points including a stretch of 18 consecutive points.

In the 2002 US Open, after losing to Pete Sampras in the third round in a grueling five-set match, Rusedski described Sampras as "a half-step slow" and predicted that Sampras would lose his fourth-round match to young German star Tommy Haas. Sampras, however, went on to win the tournament.

At Wimbledon in 2003, Rusedski was playing in a second-round match against Andy Roddick. Roddick had won the first two sets, but Rusedski was 5–2 up in the third set. During a point on Roddick's service game, a member of the crowd loudly called one of Roddick's shots long, causing Rusedski to stop playing the point as he believed it was a line judge. The umpire ruled that the ball was good and that, as Roddick's next shot landed in court, Roddick was awarded the point. Rusedski, believing the point should have been replayed, launched into a long and expletive-riddled tirade at the umpire and, never regaining his composure, went on to lose the next five games without reply to concede the match. Rusedski apologized after the match, and Roddick reached the semifinals.

Rusedski tested positive for nandrolone in January 2004, but was cleared of the charges in a hearing on 10 March 2004.

Rusedski was defeated in the second round of Wimbledon in 2005 by Joachim Johansson of Sweden. Later that year, he defended his title at the Hall of Fame Championship, defeating Vince Spadea in the final. This was the first time he had successfully defended a title and the third time he had won the championship. He then reached the semifinals at both the RCA Championships in Indianapolis, losing to Taylor Dent, and the Canada Masters tournament in Montreal, losing to Andre Agassi.

Towards the end of 2005, Rusedski's ranking had risen to the high thirties. A poor end to the year by Henman almost allowed Rusedski to overtake him as UK No. 1 again. However, a defeat for Rusedski in the first round of the Challenger event in Dnepropetrovsk, Ukraine, left him ranked 38th, just one place short of regaining the UK top spot. Rusedski finally reclaimed the UK number-one spot on 15 May 2006, overtaking Andy Murray by getting to the third round of the Rome Masters. He lost the top UK ranking again after a first-round exit at Wimbledon.

On 7 April 2007, Rusedski officially retired from tennis after partnering with Jamie Murray to a doubles victory over the Netherlands in a Davis Cup match, a result which gave Great Britain a winning 3–0 lead in the tie. He announced his retirement immediately after the win during a live interview with Sue Barker on BBC Television. Rusedski has stayed involved with professional tennis in his retirement, and currently works for the Lawn Tennis Association as a talent and performance ambassador. Rusedski held the record for fastest serve at 149 miles per hour until Andy Roddick broke it.

On 24 January 2009, Rusedski confirmed he had been seeking a return to professional tennis. However, Davis Cup captain John Lloyd turned down his offer to compete in the Davis Cup, and Rusedski was unable to obtain any wild-card tournament entries. Because of this, Rusedski quickly retracted his announcement and is still retired.

Rusedski vs. Henman
Rusedski was often overshadowed in the British press by Henman, especially at Wimbledon. They were generally closely matched over their careers; both reached a highest world ranking of 4. Rusedski won 15 singles titles compared to Henman's eleven, and also reached the final of the US Open in 1997, whereas Henman never made it past the semifinals of a Grand Slam tournament. However, Henman reached six Grand Slam semifinals and an additional four quarterfinals, whereas Rusedski reached two Grand Slam quarterfinals in total: at the US Open where he reached the final, and at Wimbledon the same year. Neither Rusedski nor Henman ever reached the quarterfinals of the Australian Open. Henman reached the semifinals of the French Open, while Rusedski never made it past the fourth round at that tournament.

His Davis Cup singles record was considerably poorer than Henman's. In Great Britain's two key Davis Cup ties in the World Group knockout stage, Rusedski lost all four singles rubbers, despite home advantage (against the US in 1999 and Sweden in 2002). However, as a doubles partnership, Rusedski and Henman won several Davis Cup matches, as well as other tournaments.

Rusedski's final match at a Grand Slam was against Henman, at the 2006 US Open. Henman won 7–6, 6–2, 6–3. Over their careers, in head-to-head encounters, Henman won 8–2.

Media career
Rusedski has an active media career, having written columns for The Sun, The Daily Mirror and The Daily Telegraph. He also works for the television channel British Eurosport providing analysis during the stations coverage of the Australian Open. He provided commentary and analysis for Sky Sports for their coverage of the US Open and ATP World Tour Events, and for the BBC's coverage of Wimbledon. He has done some acting, appearing in an episode of Agatha Christie's Marple as a tennis player. In 2008, he appeared as a contestant on the reality TV shows Dancing on Ice and Beat the Star. He has also appeared in "Dictionary Corner" on the Channel 4 game show Countdown.

Grand Slam tournament finals

Singles: 1 (0–1)

Other significant finals

Grand Slam Cup

Singles: 1 (1–0)

Masters Series

Singles: 2 (1–1)

Career finals

Singles: 27 (15 titles, 12 runners-up)

Doubles: 5 (3 titles, 2 runner-ups)

Singles performance timeline

1 This event was held in Stockholm through 1994, Essen in 1995, and Stuttgart from 1996 through 2001.

2 Rusedski was granted British citizenship in May 1995, and competed for Great Britain from 22 May 1995 onwards.

Top 10 wins

References

External links

 
 
 
 
 BBC Sport – Greg Rusedski profile
 

1973 births
Living people
Anglophone Quebec people
BBC Sports Personality of the Year winners
British male tennis players
British people of Polish descent
British people of Ukrainian descent
Canadian emigrants to England
Canadian male tennis players
Canadian people of English descent
Canadian people of Polish descent
Canadian people of Ukrainian descent
Citizens of the United Kingdom through descent
Olympic tennis players of Great Britain
Tennis commentators
Tennis players at the 1996 Summer Olympics
Tennis players at the 2000 Summer Olympics
Tennis players from Montreal
US Open (tennis) junior champions
Wimbledon junior champions
Grand Slam (tennis) champions in boys' doubles